Autophagy-related protein 13 also known as ATG13 is a protein that in humans is encoded by the KIAA0652 gene.

ATG13 is an autophagy factor required for phagosome formation. ATG13 is a target of the TOR kinase signaling pathway that regulates autophagy through phosphorylation of ATG13 and ULK1, and the regulation of the ATG13-ULK1-RB1CC1 complex.

References

External links

Further reading